Mynydd Dolgoed or Craig Portas is a mountain in southern Snowdonia, Wales. It is a long ridge running from a low summit between the valleys of the Afon Angell and the Nant Ceiswyn, north east to the cliff of Craig Portas above Dinas Mawddwy. The next mountain in the ridge to south-east is Mynydd Hendre-ddu, while to the south lie Mynydd Llwydiarth and Mynydd Cymerau.

It is one of the Dyfi hills.

References

Mountains and hills of Snowdonia
Landmarks in Wales
Mountains and hills of Gwynedd
Mawddwy
Dyfi Hills